George Oldham may refer to:

G. Ashton Oldham (George Ashton Oldham, 1877–1963), American bishop, 1929–1949
George Oldham (architect), British architect
George Oldham (footballer) (1920–1993), English footballer, 1938–1947